Elizabeth Kent may refer to:
 
Isis Pogson (1852–1945), British astronomer, also known as Elizabeth Isis Kent
Elizabeth Kent (writer), 19th-century British writer on botany and horticulture
Elizabeth Thacher Kent (1868–1952), environmentalist and women's rights activist